Gloria “Glory” Alozie Oluchi (born 30 December 1977 in Amator, Abia State) is a Nigerian-born Spanish track and field athlete competing mostly in hurdling.

The world junior second placer from 1996, she went on to have a successful senior career, although she has never won a global international event (placing second on five occasions). While representing Nigeria she became African champion twice, and she was at a time the African record and Commonwealth record holder at 100 metres hurdles.

On 6 July 2001 she officially became a Spanish citizen and she won the gold medal at the 2002 European Athletics Championships the year after.

Personal bests

International competitions

References

External links

1977 births
Living people
Sportspeople from Abia State
Spanish female hurdlers
Spanish female sprinters
Nigerian female hurdlers
Nigerian female sprinters
Olympic athletes of Spain
Olympic silver medalists for Spain
Athletes (track and field) at the 2000 Summer Olympics
Athletes (track and field) at the 2004 Summer Olympics
World Athletics Championships medalists
European Athletics Championships medalists
Nigerian emigrants to Spain
Naturalised citizens of Spain
Medalists at the 2000 Summer Olympics
Olympic silver medalists in athletics (track and field)
African Games gold medalists for Nigeria
African Games medalists in athletics (track and field)
Goodwill Games medalists in athletics
Mediterranean Games gold medalists for Spain
Mediterranean Games medalists in athletics
Athletes (track and field) at the 1999 All-Africa Games
Athletes (track and field) at the 2005 Mediterranean Games
Athletes (track and field) at the 2009 Mediterranean Games
Competitors at the 2001 Goodwill Games
Goodwill Games gold medalists in athletics
Spanish sportspeople of African descent
Spanish people of Nigerian descent
Sportspeople of Nigerian descent